Andrew Harrison (born 18 November 1970) is a British businessman, and former chairman of Carphone Warehouse.

Early life
Harrison grew up in St Helens, the son of a window cleaner and factory worker father. He was educated at Rainford High School from 1981 to 1989, and earned a bachelor's degree in management studies from the University of Leeds in 1992.

Career
In June 2013, Harrison replaced Roger Taylor as CEO of Carphone Warehouse, a position he held until the company's 2014 £3.8 billion merger with Dixons Retail, after which he became deputy CEO of Dixons Carphone. In December 2017, it was announced that he would leave Dixons Carphone and return as chairman of Carphone Warehouse to shake up the struggling company.

In April 2019, Harrison joined the board of WhoCanFixMyCar.com as chairman.

Harrison was named TechRadar's Mobile Power 50 Person of the year in 2009 and 2014. Harrison is also a founding partner at Freston Road Ventures.

Personal life
He is married to Tristia Harrison (née Clarke), CEO of TalkTalk Group since May 2017. They have two sons, and live in west London.

References

1970 births
Alumni of the University of Leeds
British chief executives
Living people